On My Own is the second studio album by German girl group Queensberry. It was released  by Starwatch Music, Cheyenne Records, and Warner Music on 6 November 2009 in German-speaking Europe, featuring production by Alex Geringas, Pete Kirtley, Philip Larsen, and MachoPsycho as well as its two singles "Too Young" and "Hello (Turn Your Radio On)", a Shakespears Sister cover.

Upon its release, the album performed moderately on the charts, reaching the top thirty in Germany only. It marked the group's last album to feature the group's original line-up. In July 2010, it was announced that original members Trapani and Ulbrich were parting with the band to be replaced with Selina Herrero and Ronja Hilbig.

Track listing

Charts

References

External links
 Queensberry.de — official website

2009 albums
Warner Music Group albums
Queensberry (band) albums